The following is an alphabetical list of members of the United States House of Representatives from the state of Maryland.  For chronological tables of members of both houses of the United States Congress from the state (through the present day), see United States congressional delegations from Maryland. The list of names should be complete, but other data may be incomplete.

Current representatives 
As of January 2023
 : Andy Harris (R) (since 2011)
 : Dutch Ruppersberger (D) (since 2003)
 : John Sarbanes (D) (since 2007)
 : Glenn Ivey (D) (since 2023)
 : Steny Hoyer (D) (since 1981)
 : David Trone (D) (since 2019)
 : Kweisi Mfume (D) (since 2020)
 : Jamie Raskin (D) (since 2017)

List of members representing the state

See also

List of United States senators from Maryland
United States congressional delegations from Maryland
Maryland's congressional districts

Notes

References

 Congressional Biographical Directory of the United States 1774–present

Maryland
 
Representatives from Maryland